Bani Gomkan (، also Romanized as Bānī Gomkān; also known as Kānī Savārān (، ) and Bānī Gomgān) is a village in Bazan Rural District, in the Central District of Javanrud County, Kermanshah Province, Iran. At the 2006 census, its population was 54, in 12 families.

References 

Populated places in Javanrud County